Oleksandra Kashuba (born 6 June 1996) is a Ukrainian competitor in synchronized swimming.

She won a gold medal at the 2014 European Aquatics Championships and 2016 European Aquatics Championships. At the 2017 World Aquatics Championships Kashuba won a silver medal in combination event and a bronze medal in team free routine.

References

Extermnal links
FINA profile

1996 births
Living people
Ukrainian synchronized swimmers
European Aquatics Championships medalists in synchronised swimming
European Championships (multi-sport event) silver medalists
Sportspeople from Donetsk
21st-century Ukrainian women